Plazas is a surname. Notable people with the surname include:

Cristina Plazas (born 1969), Spanish actress
Jessica Plazas (born 2002), Colombian tennis player